A list of films produced by the Bollywood film industry based in Mumbai in the 1980s:

|

See also 
 Bollywood
 List of highest-grossing Bollywood films
 List of highest-grossing Bollywood films in overseas markets
 :Category:Lists of Bollywood films by year

1980s
Bollywood
Bollywood